Bhargavaea beijingensis  is a Gram-positive, moderately halotolerant and non-motile bacterium from the genus of Bhargavaea which has been isolated from the root of a ginseng plant.

References

External links
Type strain of Bhargavaea beijingensis at BacDive -  the Bacterial Diversity Metadatabase

Bacillales
Bacteria described in 2009